Michael Hargreaves Whitten is an Australian jurist. Since 2 September 2019 he has served as Lord Chief Justice of Tonga.

Whitten grew up in Mackay, Queensland and is the son of a butcher and a boiler marker. He worked as a public defender in Brisbane from 1986–88, and then as a clerk for a Queensland District Court judge from 1988 - 1989. In 1990 he was admitted to the Queensland bar, and practiced criminal and family law. He moved to Melbourne in 1996, where he practiced civil and commercial law. In 2015 he was appointed a Queen's Counsel.

In July 2019 he was appointed to the Supreme Court of Tonga as Lord Chief Justice, replacing Owen Paulsen. His term as Chief Justice began on 2 September 2019.

As Chief Justice he presided over the appeal of former Prime Minister Sialeʻataongo Tuʻivakanō against his bribery, money laundering and firearms convictions, and over the electoral petition which saw cabinet minister Sione Sangster Saulala lose his seat following the 2021 Tongan general election.

In 2020 his home in Tonga was destroyed by Cyclone Harold.

References

Living people
People from Mackay, Queensland
Australian King's Counsel
Supreme Court of Tonga justices
Chief justices of Tonga
Year of birth missing (living people)